Stephen Gough (born 14 October 1972) is a Canadian short track speed skater. He competed in the men's 5000 metre relay event at the 1994 Winter Olympics.

References

External links
 

1972 births
Living people
Canadian male short track speed skaters
Olympic short track speed skaters of Canada
Short track speed skaters at the 1994 Winter Olympics
Sportspeople from Fredericton
20th-century Canadian people